The 
World Professional Billiards and Snooker Association, the governing body for professional snooker, first published official world rankings for players on the main tour for the 1976–77 season. Before this, the defending champion was seeded first, and the previous year's runner-up second, for each tournament.

For the 1977–78 season, players' performances in the previous three World Snooker Championships (1975, 1976, and 1977) contributed to their points total. For each of the three years, the World Champion was awarded five points, the runner-up received four, losing semi-finalists got three, players eliminated in the quarter-finals gained two, and losers in the last-16 round received a single point. If players were level on points, then those gained in the most recent event determined positioning.

Ray Reardon retained top place in the rankings from the 1976/1977 listing, with 12 points. John Spencer, the 1977 World Champion, was second, six places higher than in the previous season's list, on 9 points. Doug Mountjoy, at 14th, was the highest-ranked one-season professional. The eight highest-ranked players were placed directly into the last-16 round of the 1978 World Snooker Championship, whilst all other entrants were required to participate in a qualifying competition to produce the eight players to play the exempted seeds. As defending champion, Spencer was seeded first for the 1978 tournament, with the other seeds based on the rankings.

Rankings

The professional world rankings for the snooker players on the main tour in the 1977–78 season are listed below. Points gained in each of the three World Snooker Championships are shown, with the total number of points given in the last column. A "–" symbol indicates that the player did not participate in that year's championship. Some sources show Mans as placed 9th and Davis 10th, and Thorne 18th with Virgo 20th. It is unclear why three players with 0 points were included in the rankings.

References

1977
Rankings 1978
Rankings 1977